Elyse E. "Lisi" Harrison (née Gottlieb; born on July 29, 1970) is a Canadian novelist. She writes young adult fiction and is well known for her three series The Clique, Alphas and Monster High.

Personal life

Lisi Harrison was born and raised by her parents Ken Gottlieb and Shaila Gottlieb in Toronto along with her brother and sister. Harrison makes reference to her parents by dedicating her first "Clique" book to them, and she references her siblings in A Tale Of Two Pretties.

Harrison attended a Hebrew school up until she was in ninth grade, then she attended a public high school, Forest Hill Collegiate. After graduating high school, she moved to Montreal, Quebec at age 18 to attend McGill University. She was studying for a film major but left the school two years later realizing writing was her true passion. She transferred to Emerson College in Boston, Massachusetts to continue her writing. She graduated Emerson with a Bachelor of Fine Arts in creative writing.

In 2007, Harrison left New York and settled down in California with her family. She currently resides in Laguna Beach, California.she has two kids and has written 45 books

Career

Before becoming a best-selling author, Harrison moved away from Boston and worked for 12 years at MTV in New York City. Over time she became the Senior Director of Development where she was able to create and develop new shows for the network. The author said, "I learned what appeals to teens. I learned how to hold someone's attention. I learned that everyone wants to fit in and be accepted, no matter how old they are," of her experience while working at MTV. Her experience at the network was the inspiration for her bestselling series The Clique, because it reminded her of middle school life. She started writing the first two novels in the series while working at MTV so that she would still have a job if her writing career didn't work out. After selling over 9 million copies in her "Clique" series, Harrison quit her MTV job in June 2004 and focused on her writing career.
 
She has written three separate young adult book series: The Clique, Alphas, Monster High and "Pretenders".

The Clique series has 21 books in total, including a prequel, a summer collection and a dictionary-style book called The Cliquetionary. The Summer Collection is a collection of five individual books entitled with each character's names, which are about each girl's summer vacation.

Alphas is a smaller book series containing only four books, and the Monster High series also contains four books.

Harrison's first adult series, The Dirty Book Club, was released out October 10, 2017.

Works

The Clique series

The Clique (later also a movie)
Best Friends For Never
Revenge Of The Wannabes
Invasion Of The Boy Snatchers
The Pretty Committee Strikes Back
Dial L For Loser
It's Not Easy Being Mean
Sealed With A Diss
The Clique Summer Collection: Massie
The Clique Summer Collection: Dylan
The Clique Summer Collection: Alicia
The Clique Summer Collection: Kristen
The Clique Summer Collection: Claire
Bratfest At Tiffany's
P.S. I Loathe You
Boys R Us
These Boots Are Made For Stalking
My Little Phony
A Tale Of Two Pretties
Charmed And Dangerous: The Rise Of The Pretty Committee
The Cliquetionary

Alphas series

Alphas
Movers And Fakers
Belle Of The Brawl
Top Of The Feud Chain

Monster High series

Monster High
The Ghoul Next Door
Where There's A Wolf, There's A Way
Back and Deader Than Ever
Drop Dead Diary

Other
Pretenders
License To Spill
The Dirty Book Club

References

External links

1970s births
Living people
21st-century Canadian novelists
21st-century Canadian women writers
Canadian children's writers
Canadian expatriate writers in the United States
Canadian women novelists
Emerson College alumni
Writers from Toronto